The Virginia House of Delegates election of 2005 was held on Tuesday, November 8.

Results

Overview

See also 
 2005 United States elections
 2005 Virginia elections
 2005 Virginia gubernatorial election
 2005 Virginia lieutenant gubernatorial election
 2005 Virginia Attorney General election

References 

House of Delegates
Virginia
Virginia House of Delegates elections